Saturday Llewellyn Rosenberg born Llewellyn Saturday Jobbins, also known as Saturday Brander (13 July 1952 – 13 August 1998) was an Australian comedian, writer and actress.

Family
Rosenberg was born in Eltham near Melbourne, but who grew up in Sydney, Australia. She is a third generation Australian film maker, whose family includes; grandfather, cinematographer George Malcolm; parents, advertising executives Harry & Joy Jobbins; and uncle, sound recordist Ken Malcolm. She is also one of five siblings, brothers Cobbitty Jobbins, Boak Jobbins, Camden Jobbins, and sister Sheridan Jobbins.

She was married twice, firstly in Perth, Australia, to William Brander (m. 1977–1979, divorced) and later to Marc Rosenberg (m. 1986–1990, divorced)

Career
After completing high school at Ascham in Sydney, she moved to Perth, in Western Australia in the late 1970s where she studied Fine Arts at WAAPA and at the same time, started a catering business called Big Belly Bus with her first husband, Will Brander.

After they separated, she hosted two children's television shows called, Dr Featherweather's Wonderful Workshop and "Flapper's Factory" for two years.

On returning to Sydney in the early 1980s, she became a part of the New Wave of Comedy, which sprang out The Comedy Store in Jamison Street. There she performed under her married name, Saturday Brander, alongside comedians like Rodney Rude, Vince Sorrenti, Austen Tayshus and George Smilovici. She used a lot of material gained during her catering days, as well as material from working with children on television. Her most famous character was an alter-ego called Debbie Fellini.

Rosenberg, wrote her own standup material, and later went on to write several films, notably The Girl Who Came Late which was released in Australia as "Daydream Believer". The film which was produced in 1991 starred Martin Kemp and Miranda Otto.

She also wrote several films for Director, Paul Middleditch, including one called The Tin Box, and another in which she starred, called When Ships Draw Near. The latter was selected for screening at the Clermont Film Festival, and won Bronze at the 21st Huesca Film Festival.

She also appeared in numerous films and television shows including Dingo, Incident at Raven's Gate and the Australian TV show Prisoner

For the last five years of her life, Rosenberg lived in Los Angeles, where she attended the University of Southern California studying Screen Direction. A film she wrote and directed, called, "Freedom From Hunger", was chosen as an entrant into the Tropfest film festival, and screen posthumously at the festival director's discretion.

Saturday had returned to Australia, and was hit by a tourist bus on the corner of Market and College Streets in Sydney.

References

External links

Dr Featherweather's Wonderful Workshop.
Biography of Saturday Rosenberg on Medium

1952 births
Australian women comedians
Australian screenwriters
Australian television presenters
People educated at Ascham School
1998 deaths
20th-century Australian actresses
20th-century Australian comedians
Australian stand-up comedians
Australian women television presenters
20th-century Australian screenwriters